Young Men's and Young Women's Hebrew Association Building, also known as the Jewish Community Center, is a historic building located in central Baltimore, Maryland, United States. It is a three-story, flat-roofed, rectangular-shaped Flemish bond brick structure completed in 1930.  The exterior features Moorish and Jewish motifs, such as the Star of David.  It was designed by Baltimore architect Joseph Evans Sperry. It is now an apartment building. The establishment of the joining YM/YWHA building was a notable example of an attempt to bridge the divide between uptown Baltimore's prosperous German Jews and East Baltimore's impoverished Eastern European and Russian Jews. The association building was constructed midway between uptown and East Baltimore to symbolize this coming together of the two halves of Baltimore's Jewish community.

The Young Men's and Young Women's Hebrew Association Building was listed on the National Register of Historic Places in 1985. It is included in the Baltimore National Heritage Area.

References

External links
, including photo from 1985, at Maryland Historical Trust

Clubhouses in Maryland
Community centers in Maryland
Mount Vernon, Baltimore
Baltimore National Heritage Area
Buildings and structures completed in 1930
1930 establishments in Maryland
Clubhouses on the National Register of Historic Places in Baltimore
German-Jewish culture in Baltimore
Polish-Jewish culture in Baltimore
Russian-Jewish culture in Baltimore
Ukrainian-Jewish culture in Baltimore
Joseph Evans Sperry buildings
Moorish Revival architecture in Maryland